Bloedorn is a German surname. Notable people with the surname include:

 Chuck Bloedorn (1912–1998), American basketball player
 Erich Bloedorn (1902–1975), German Luftwaffe pilot
 Greg Bloedorn (born 1972), American football player
 Willi Bloedorn (1887–1946), German Nazi politician

German-language surnames